Jaak Ümarik (18 January 1891 Tuhalaane Parish, Viljandi County – 4 November 1981 Tallinn) was an Estonian politician. He was a member of Estonian Provincial Assembly.

References

1891 births
1981 deaths
Members of the Estonian Provincial Assembly